Arif Pašalić (31 August 1943 – 26 April 1998) was a Bosnian military officer who commanded the 4th Corps of the Army of Bosnia and Herzegovina (ARBIH) during the Bosnian War.

Early life and education

Pašalić was born in the hamlet of Janjići in the Zenica municipality. He enrolled in a secondary school for army officers in 1963. In 1967 he was commissioned as an officer in the Yugoslav National Army (JNA). From 1977 until 1979 he attended the JNA staff and command college in Belgrade.

Career

When the political situation in Bosnia and Herzegovina began to heat up early 1992, Pašalić was stationed in Sarajevo. He left the JNA in March 1992 with the rank of potpukovnik, the Yugoslav equivalent of lieutenant colonel.

In April 1992 Pašalić arrived in Mostar and joined the local Territorial defence (TO) formation. On 17 November 1992 Pašalić personally inaugurated the 4th Corps of the ARBIH. He commanded the 4th Corps through much of the Croat–Bosniak War. Following the end of the war in Bosnia and Herzegovina Pašalić became a top officer in the Army of the Federation of Bosnia and Herzegovina.

Death

He was killed in an automobile accident near Drežnica, Mostar on 26 April 1998, aged 54.

References

External links
Pašalić's complaints about ceasefire

1943 births
1998 deaths
Bosniaks of Bosnia and Herzegovina
Bosnia and Herzegovina Muslims
People from Zenica
Bosnia and Herzegovina generals
Army of the Republic of Bosnia and Herzegovina soldiers
Road incident deaths in Bosnia and Herzegovina
Officers of the Yugoslav People's Army